Javadi is a surname. People with the surname include

People
Abdollah Javadi-Amoli (born 1933), Iranian politician and Islamic scholar
Ahmad Sayyed Javadi (1917–2013), Iranian lawyer and politician
Ali Javadi (born 1953), Iranian political activist and communist
Ali Javadi (footballer) (born 1967), Iranian footballer
Asghar Sayyed Javadi (1925–2018), Iranian writer and activist
Ebrahim Javadi (born 1943), Iranian wrestler
Fatemeh Javadi (born 1959), Iranian politician
Fattaneh Haj Seyed Javadi (born 1945), Iranian author
Mirmostafa Javadi (born 2000), Iranian weightlifter
Négar Djavadi (born 1969), Iranian-French novelist and filmmaker
Ramin Djawadi (born 1974), Iranian-German composer
Rana Javadi (born 1953), Iranian photographer
Roknodin Javadi (born 1957), Iranian politician and businessman
Zeeshan Haider Jawadi (1938–2000), Indian scholar, poet, and philosopher

Fictional characters
Majid Javadi, fictional character in the TV show Homeland

See also
 Javadi Hills, range of hills in India

Iranian-language surnames